Ananda Shipyards and Slipways is a Bangladeshi shipbuilding company. It is the first Bangladeshi shipbuilding company to deliver a seagoing vessel to a foreign customer. It is a part of the Ananda Group of companies. Until November 2008 the company has received orders worth $373 million from European and African buyers for building 34 vessels.

Delivered ships

 6 ferries and boats to the Mozambique government.

See also
 Ananda Group
 Shipbuilding in Bangladesh
 List of companies of Bangladesh

References

External links
  Website of Ananda Group
 The Khaleej Times Article
 Bangladeshi Shipbuilding Ready to Boom

Shipbuilding companies of Bangladesh
Shipyards of Bangladesh
Bangladeshi shipbuilders